Vangelis Kazan (1936 – 10 March 2008) was a Greek character actor.

Biography
Kazan was born in Nafplion. His career in theater, cinema and television spanned for half a century. He repeatedly collaborated with Theo Angelopoulos and was awarded the Best Actor award at the Thessaloniki Film Festival in 1975 for his part in The Travelling Players.  He died in Athens.

Notes

External links

Obituary ( in Greek)

1936 births
2008 deaths
Greek male film actors
People from Nafplion
Deaths from cancer in Greece